The 1176 Peak Limiter is a dynamic range compressor designed by Bill Putnam and introduced by UREI in 1967. Derived from the 175 and 176 tube compressors, it marked the transition from vacuum tubes to solid-state technology.

With its distinctive tone and its wide range of sounds, deriving from the Class A amplifiers, its input and output transformers, the uncommonly fast attack and release times and their program dependence, and different compression ratios and modes, the 1176 was immediately appreciated by engineers and producers and established as a studio standard through the years. At the time of its introduction, it was the first true peak limiter with all solid-state circuitry.

The 1176LN was inducted into the TECnology Hall of Fame in 2008.

History 

In 1966, Bill Putnam, engineer and founder of Universal Audio, began to employ the recently invented field-effect transistors (FET), replacing vacuum tubes in his equipment designs. After successfully adapting the 108 tube microphone preamplifier into the new FET-based 1108, he redesigned the 175 and 176 variable-mu tube compressors into the new 1176 compressor.

The initial units (A and AB revisions) were available in 1967 and were informally referred as "blue stripe" for their blue-colored meter section. Revision C, designed in 1970, saw one of the major design evolution, with less noise and harmonic distortion. It was renamed to 1176LN and the face color changed to the now familiar solid black.

Bill Putnam sold UREI in 1985 and Revision H was the last series produced by the original company. However, the company was re-established as Universal Audio in 1999 by the sons Bill Putnam, Jr. and Jim Putnam, and re-issued the 1176LN as its first product. The original design was reproduced and revised thanks to the extensive design notes left by Bill Putnam.

Design
The 1176 uses a field-effect transistor (FET) to obtain gain reduction arranged in a feedback configuration. As its predecessor, the 1176 utilizes soft knee compression and fixed threshold: compression amount is controlled through the input control. The compression character is handled by attack and release times and four selectable compression ratios. The release time is program-dependent:  it is quicker after transients to obtain a more consistent level, but it slows down after sustained and heavy compression to reduce pumping effects. The threshold is set higher on higher ratios.

 Four different compression ratios are available: 4:1, 8:1, 12:1, and 20:1
 Attack time is adjustable from 20 μs to 800 μs (0.00002–0.0008 seconds) 
 Release times are adjustable from 50 ms to 1100 ms (0.05–1.1 seconds)
 Two units can be linked for proper stereo operation (not just dual mono)

"All-button" or British mode 
The ratio buttons are designed to be mutually exclusive, so that pressing one ratio button deselects the others. However, British engineers discovered it was possible to push all four buttons in at once, an unexpected use case that led to unintended behaviour, with a substantial increase of harmonic distortion. This became known as "All-button" mode or British mode, and is popular enough to be explicitly supported by modern clones of the 1176.

Revisions
The 1176 underwent a number of revisions; one notable change in the early revisions was the addition of Brad Plunkett's circuitry, which reduced noise by 6 dB and redistributed the noise spectrum, producing even more noise reduction in the sensitive mid-range; linearity was also increased by reducing harmonic distortion. These revisions, easily distinguishable for their solid black face panel, were labelled 1176LN.

Revisions D and E are reputed to sound the best.

Reputation
Mike Shipley says "The 1176 absolutely adds a bright character to a sound, and you can set the attack so it's got a nice bite to it. I usually use them on four to one, with quite a lot of gain reduction. I like how variable the attack and release is; there's a sound on the attack and release which I don't think you can get with any other compressor. I listen for how it affects the vocal, and depending on the song I set the attack or release—faster attack if I want a bit more bite. My preference is for the black face model, the 4000 series—I think the top end is especially clean."

Jim Scott says "They have an equalizer kind of effect, adding a coloration that's bright and clear. Not only do they give you a little more impact from the compression, they also sort of clear things up; maybe a little bottom end gets squeezed out or maybe they are just sort of excitingly solid state or whatever they are. The big thing for me is the clarity, and the improvement in the top end."

See also
 UREI
 LA-2A Leveling Amplifier

References 

Dynamics processing
Effects units